George Worthington (4 March 1822 – 27 July 1900) was an English first-class cricketer.

The son of Charles Worthington, he was born in September 1822. He was educated at Tonbridge School, before going up to St John's College, Oxford. While studying at Oxford, he made two appearances in first-class cricket for Oxford University in 1844, against the Marylebone Cricket Club and Cambridge University in The University Match. Worthington found himself without a profession in later life due to ill health. He died at Bristol in July 1900.

References

External links

1822 births
1900 deaths
People educated at Tonbridge School
Alumni of St John's College, Oxford
English cricketers
Oxford University cricketers